Franciscus Portus (Latin; Greek: Φραγκίσκος Πόρτος, Italian: Francesco Porto) (1511 – 1581) was a Greek-Italian Renaissance humanist and classical scholar.

Biography
Born on Crete on 22 August 1511, Portus was orphaned early. He studied in his youth with Arsenius Apostolius. He went to study in Italy thanks to the generosity of a family friend. He studied for six years in Padova, and then went to Venice, where he was admitted to the city's Greek school, where he soon became the director ("ἀρχιδιδάσκαλος καὶ πρωτοκαθηγητὴς τῶν Ἑλλήνων"). During the decade from 1526 to 1535, one should also note his important activity as a copyist of Greek manuscripts. However, he was an adherent of Reformed Christianity, and certain mocking remarks that he made about the customs of traditional Christian religion, such as fasting and veneration of images, caused him to leave Venice.

In 1536, Portus obtained a Chair in Greek at Modena, although he was unwilling to sign the declaration of faith which was required of public officials. In 1542, he was hired by Renée of France, the Duchess of Ferrara, as tutor to her sons, and she also entrusted to him the secret correspondence that she was maintaining with John Calvin. He was admitted to the Accademia dei Filareti, founded in Ferrara in 1554, and spoke before the Duchess a speech in praise of the Greek language.

After the death of the Duke of Ferrara, Ercole II d'Este, in 1559, the Duchess returned to France. In fear of the Inquisition because of his religious views, Portus left Ferrara with his family, and spent some time in the area of Friuli before settling in Geneva, becoming a citizen of Geneva in 1562. In the same year, he was appointed to the Chair of Greek at the University of Geneva, which he occupied until his death. One of his most important students was Isaac Casaubon, whom he recommended to succeed him.

After the St. Bartholomew's Day massacre in 1572, he had a polemical correspondence with his former colleague Pierre Charpentier, which became the instrument of French governmental propaganda and justified the massacre through the existence of a pretended plot against the royal family.

Portus died in Geneva on 5 June 1581.

Scholarship

Portus corrected and annotated the texts of many Ancient Greek authors, and translated many into Latin, including Aristotle's Rhetoric, the treatises of Hermogenes of Tarsus, Aphthonius and pseudo-Longinus (edition printed by Jean Crespin in 1569), the Syntax of Apollonius Dyscolus, the hymns and letters of Synesius of Cyrene, and the Odes of Gregory of Nazianus.

He also produced commentaries on numerous authors: Homer, Pindar, the Greek tragedians (Aeschylus, Sophocles and Euripides), Aristophanes, Thucydides, Xenophon, Demosthenes, Theocritus, Dionysius of Halicarnassus.

He provided corrections and additional remarks to the Lexicon of Robert Constantin (Geneva, 1592).

Shortly after his death, his son published many further volumes of his work at Lausanne: Commentarii in Pindari Olympia, Pythia, Nemea, Isthmia (1583); six of his treatises entitled In omnes Sophoclis tragœdias prolegomena, Sophoclis et Euripidis collatio, etc. (1584); and Commentarii in varia Xenophontis opuscula (1586). He also published his Rhetoric of Aristotle at Speyer in 1598.

Portus' son Aemilius Portus (born in Ferrara, 13 August 1553; died in Stadthagen, 1614 or 1615) taught Greek in Geneva alongside his father from 1569, and then at Lausanne from 1581 to 1592, and then at Heidelberg from 1596 to 1608, and published numerous works (including works by his father).

Modern editions of Portus' work

 Paolo Tavonatti (ed.), Francisci Porti Cretensis Commentaria in Aeschyli Tragoedias, doctoral thesis, University of Trento and EHESS, 2010. (Edition of Portus' commentaries on Aeschylus.)

List of works 
1568: Synesii Cyrenaei ... Hymni ... Gregorii Nazianzeni Odae aliquot ... Utrisque ...  latinam  interpretationem  adiunxit      ,  Genevae.  
1569: Oἱ ἐν ῥητορικῇ τέχνῃ κορυφαίοι,    
 1573: Ad  Petri  Carpentarii  Causidici  virulentam  epistolam,  responsio  Francisci Porti ... pro causariorum quos vocat innocentia. 
1574: Response  de  François  Portus  Candiot,  aux  lettres  diffamatoires  de  Pierre Carpentier, ... pour l'innocence des fidèles serviteurs de Dieu ... massacrez le 24 jour d'aoust 1572, appellez factieux par ce plaidereau, traduite nouvellement de latin en françois. 
1580: Homeri  Ilias,  postrema  editio  ...  a       innumeris in locis emendata, Genevae. 
1583: Francisci Porti ... Commentarii in Pindari Olympia, Pythia, Nemea, Isthmia, Genevae. 
1584: Francisci  Porti  Cretensis in omnes Sophoclis tragoedias προλεγόμενα, ut vulgò vocantur. 
1586: Francisci Porti ... Commentarii in varia Xenophontis opuscula, Lausannae.
1590: Apollonii  Alexandrini  de  syntaxi ... libri IV. 
1592: Lexicon graecolatinum R. CONSTANTINI. Secunda hac editio partim ipsius authoris partim   ... auctum, Genevae. 
1594: Thucydidis, Olori filii, de Bello Peloponnesiaco libri octo. Iidem latine, ex interpretatione  Laurentii  Vallae,  ab  Henrico  Stephano  nuper  recognita,  quam Aemilius  Portus,  Francisci  Porti  Cretensis  f.,  paternos  commentarios  accurate sequutus,  ab  infinita  ...  errorum  multitudine  ...  repurgavit  ...  in  hac  postrema editione, Francofurti. 
1598: Aristotelis Artis rhetoricae, sive de arte dicendi, libri III, a M. Aemilio Porto ... nova interpretatione illustrati; item Francisci Porti ... in eosdem libros perpetui latini commentarii, Spirae.

References

Further reading

G. Burges, "F. Portus and his Aeschylus", CJ, 25 (1822) pp. 159–160. 
 S. Baud-Bovy, "Un Crétois au Collège de Genève au XVIe siècle: François Portus", Annales du Collège de Genève, 8 (1949) pp. 22–27. 
 M.I. Μανούσακας and N.M. Παναγιωτάκης, "Η φιλομεταρρυθμιστική δράση του Φραγκίσκου Πόρτου στη Μόδενα και στη Φερράρα  και  η  δίκη  του  από  την  Ιερά  Εξέταση  της  Βενετίας  (1536-1559)", Θησαυρίσματα 18 (1981), pp. 7–118.
M.  Manoussakas, "L'aventure  vénitienne  de  François  Portus", Bulletin de la Société d'Histoire et d'Archéologie de Genève, XVII, 1980-1983 [1985], pp. 299–314. 
M. Mund-Dopchie, "François Portus et le tragiques grecs", in I. D. McFarlane (ed.) Acta conventus neo-latini Sanctandreani, Proceedings of the Fifth International Congress of Neo-Latin Studies, St. Andrews 24 August to 1 September 1982, Binghamton (New York) 1986, pp. 597–603.
I. Kallergis, "Die kritische Arbeit des Humanisten Franciscus Portus am Text des Aischylos", WS 107-108 (1994–95) II, pp. 639–46. 
M. Papanicolaou, "Francesco Porto e il greco volgare nei rapporti con Scaliger, Crusius, Gesner", ΑΘΗΝΑ 82 (1999) pp. 257–298.
M. Papanicolaou, "Autografi non noti di Francesco ed Emilio Porto", in T. Creazzo and G. Strano (eds.) Atti del VI congresso nazionale dell'Associazione italiana di Studi Bizantini, Catania-Messina 2-5 ottobre 2000. Catania, 2004. 
E. Belligni, "Francesco Porto da Ferrara a Ginevra", in Ludovico Castelvetro, letterati e grammatici nella crisi religiosa del Cinquecento, Atti della XIII giornata Luigi Firpo (Torino, 21-22 settembre 2006), a c. di M. Firpo e G. Mongini, Florence 2008, pp. 357–89. 
P. Tavonatti, "Le congetture di Franciscus Portus alle Eumenidi", Lexis, 26 (2008) pp. 91–93.
P. Tavonatti, "Demetrio Triclinio tra le fonti di Franciscus Portus?", in Bollettino dei Classici, Roma, Scienze e Lettere Editore Commerciale, Serie 3a, Volume XXX (2009).
 P. Tavonatti, "Il contributo di Francesco Porto alla filologia eschilea", Ítaca. Quaderns Catalans de Cultura Clàssica, no. 27, 2011, pp. 155–164.

16th-century Greek people
1511 births
1581 deaths
Greek Renaissance humanists
People from Rethymno (regional unit)
Scholars from the Republic of Geneva
16th-century Greek educators
16th-century Greek writers
16th-century male writers
Academic staff of the University of Geneva